The 1922 Football Association Charity Shield was played on 10 May 1922. The game was played at Old Trafford, home of Manchester United, and was contested by the FA Cup holders Huddersfield Town and First Division champions Liverpool. The game ended in a 1–0 win for Huddersfield Town with the winning goal scored by Tom Wilson. This was the last Charity Shield game to take place in May.

Venue

Match details

See also
1921–22 Football League
1921–22 FA Cup

References

FA Community Shield
Fa Charity Shield, 1922
Comm
Charity Shield 1922
Charity Shield 1922
1920s in Manchester
May 1922 sports events